The Battle is a 1964 German novel by Alexander Kluge. The novel is a historical account of the battle of Stalingrad in the form of an experimental  montage of materials, including diary entries, government reports, and interviews.

References

1964 German novels
Works about the Battle of Stalingrad
Works by Alexander Kluge
Novels set during World War II
German historical novels